Idrees Sulieman (August 7, 1923 – July 23, 2002) was an American bop and hard bop trumpeter.

Biography
He was born Leonard Graham in St. Petersburg, Florida, United States, later changing his name to Idrees Sulieman, after converting to Islam. He studied at the Boston Conservatory, and gained early experience playing with the Carolina Cotton Pickers and the wartime Earl Hines Orchestra (1943–1944).

On October 15, 1947, he played on Thelonious Monk's first recording for Blue Note Records. Sulieman was closely associated with Mary Lou Williams and for a time and had stints with Cab Calloway, John Coltrane, Count Basie, and Lionel Hampton. Sulieman recorded with Coleman Hawkins (1957) and gigged with Randy Weston (1958–1959), in addition to appearing in many other situations.

He toured Europe in 1961 with Oscar Dennard, and stayed, settling in Stockholm at first, and then moved to Copenhagen in 1964. A soloist with the Kenny Clarke/Francy Boland Big Band from the mid-1960s through 1973, Sulieman frequently worked with radio orchestras. His recordings as a leader were for Swedish Columbia (1964) and SteepleChase (1976 and 1985). In 1985, he was among the performers on Miles Davis' album, Aura, which was not released until 1989. Sulieman's career slowed down considerably in the 1990s.

Death
He died of bladder cancer on July 23, 2002 at St. Anthony's Hospital in St. Petersburg, Florida, at the age of 78.

Discography

As leader
 Three Trumpets (Prestige, 1957) with Donald Byrd and Art Farmer
 Interplay for 2 Trumpets and 2 Tenors (Prestige, 1957) with John Coltrane, Bobby Jaspar and Webster Young
Roots (New Jazz, 1957) with the Prestige All Stars
Americans in Europe (Impulse!, 1963) with Various Artists
The Camel (Columbia, 1964) with Jamila Sulieman 
 Now Is the Time (SteepleChase, 1976) with Cedar Walton, Sam Jones, Billy Higgins
 Bird's Grass (SteepleChase, 1976 [1985]) with Horace Parlan, Niels-Henning Ørsted Pedersen, Kenny Clarke
 Groovin' (SteepleChase, 1985) with Horace Parlan

As sideman
With Gene Ammons
Jammin' in Hi Fi with Gene Ammons (Prestige, 1957)
Blue Gene (Prestige, 1958)
With Art Blakey
Art Blakey Big Band (Bethlehem, 1957)
With Clifford Brown
Memorial (Prestige, 1953)
With Teddy Charles
Coolin' (New Jazz, 1957)
With the Kenny Clarke/Francy Boland Big Band
Handle with Care (Atlantic, 1963)
Now Hear Our Meanin' (Columbia, 1963 [1965])
Sax No End (SABA, 1967)
Out of the Folk Bag (Columbia, 1967)
17 Men and Their Music (Campi, 1967)
All Smiles (MPS, 1968)
Faces (MPS, 1968)
Latin Kaleidoscope (MPS, 1968)
Fellini 712 (MPS, 1969)
All Blues (MPS, 1969)
More Smiles (MPS, 1969)
Clarke Boland Big Band en Concert avec Europe 1 (Tréma, 1969 [1992])
With Don Byas / Bud Powell
A Tribute To Cannonball (Columbia 1962)
With Miles Davis
Aura (Columbia, 1985)
With Eric Dolphy
Stockholm Sessions (Enja, 1961)
With Tommy Flanagan
The Cats (New Jazz, 1957)
With Dexter Gordon 
More Than You Know (SteepleChase, 1975)
With Friedrich Gulda
Friedrich Gulda at Birdland (RCA Victor, 1957)
A Man of Letters (Decca, 1957)
With Coleman Hawkins
The Hawk Flies High (Riverside, 1957)
With Joe Henderson
Big Band (Verve, 1992–96)
With Bobby Jaspar
Bobby Jaspar (Riverside, 1957)
With Thad Jones
Live at the Montmartre: A Good Time Was Had by All (Storyville, 1978)
With Carmen McRae
November Girl (Black Lion, 1970)
With Thelonious Monk
Genius of Modern Music, Vol. 1 (Blue Note, 1947)
With Horace Parlan
Arrival (SteepleChase, 1973)
With Max Roach
The Max Roach Quartet featuring Hank Mobley (Debut, 1953)
With Sahib Shihab
Companionship (Vogue Schallplatten, 1964-70 [1971])
With Mal Waldron
Mal-1 (Prestige, 1956)
Mal-2 (Prestige, 1957)
With Randy Weston
Little Niles (United Artists, 1958)
Spirits of Our Ancestors (Verve, 1991)
With Ernie Wilkins
Top Brass (Savoy, 1955)
With Lester Young
Masters of Jazz (Storyville, 1951–56)

References

External links

Curt's Jazz Café: Obscure Trumpet Masters #9 -- Idrees Sulieman

1923 births
2002 deaths
American jazz trumpeters
American male trumpeters
Bebop trumpeters
Hard bop trumpeters
Musicians from St. Petersburg, Florida
SteepleChase Records artists
Prestige Records artists
20th-century American musicians
American Ahmadis
American Muslims
20th-century trumpeters
Deaths from cancer in Florida
Deaths from bladder cancer
DR Big Band members
20th-century American male musicians
American male jazz musicians
Kenny Clarke/Francy Boland Big Band members
Converts to Islam